The Battle of Nambanje was a minor engagement between British and German colonial forces during the East African Campaign of World War I. It involved the 1st East African Division and took place on 13 March 1917. Several British units were ordered to attack German forces that had been spotted near Nambanje. The British advance was detected by the Germans the day before, which enabled them to prepare and repulse the attack.

Notes

References

External links
 1st East African Division (archived version)

Battles of the East African Campaign
Battles of World War I involving Germany
Battles of World War I involving the United Kingdom
March 1917 events